Enoplometopus antillensis (commonly dwarf reef lobster, Atlantic reef lobster or flaming reef lobster) is a species of reef lobster endemic to warmer parts of the Atlantic Ocean. Dwarf reef lobsters are prized in the home aquarium hobby for their bright colors and small size.

References

External links
 

Decapods
Arthropods of the Dominican Republic
Crustaceans of the Atlantic Ocean
Crustaceans described in 1865
Taxa named by Christian Frederik Lütken